Euxoa camalpa is a species of cutworm or dart moth in the family Noctuidae. It is found in North America.

The MONA or Hodges number for Euxoa camalpa is 10772.

Subspecies
These two subspecies belong to the species Euxoa camalpa:
 Euxoa camalpa camalpa
 Euxoa camalpa manca Benjamin, 1936

References

Further reading

 
 
 

Euxoa
Articles created by Qbugbot
Moths described in 1912